Hamed Snousi (born November 3, 1989) is a Libyan footballer. He currently plays for Hmam Al Anf in Tunisia. He played for Ahly Benghazi in years 2007-2012 in which he was a defender, and wore the number 3 jersey.

References 

Libyan footballers
Living people
1989 births

Association football fullbacks
Libya international footballers